
Jandari Lake is a lake on the Azerbaijan–Georgia border, it is located in south-east Georgia and north-west Azerbaijan, at 291,4 metres above sea level. The area of surface is 10.6 km2, while the catchment area is 102 km2. Maximal depth is 7.2 m. Some 67% of the basin is located on Georgian territory and 33% in Azerbaijan.

References 

Lakes of Azerbaijan
Lakes of Georgia (country)